Inverness county constituency may refer to one of two historic county constituencies of the British House of Commons:

 Inverness-shire (UK Parliament constituency), 1708 to 1918
 Inverness (UK Parliament constituency), 1918 to 1983